was a Japanese samurai and commander of the Sengoku period.

Uragami clan had been in a position of chief retainer of the Akamatsu clan. After the fall of the Akamatsu clan, Munekage gradually held power and ruled Bizen, Mimasaka and part of Harima.

Munekage give Ukita Naoie an important position but Uragami clan went into decline as Naoie's influence increased . When Munekage arranged an alliance with Mori clan Naoie was dissatisfied with the decision and launched a rebellion against Munekage. In the end, his Tenjinyama castle was attacked and his power was overthrown by Naoie.

References

Samurai
Daimyo
People of Sengoku-period Japan
People from Okayama Prefecture